Four eyes may refer to:

 Four Eyes, comic book
 Four Eyes!, television show
 Cryptoptila immersana, a moth with the common name four eyes or ivy leafroller

See also
 
 
 Four (disambiguation)
 Eye (disambiguation)